Sayyidina Ali Secondary School, is a co-educational school located in Kampong Pandan, a suburban village in Kuala Belait, Brunei. In 2013, it had a student population of 1500, 700 of which were Pre-U students.  The current principal is Mr. Awang Steven Shin Sheau Huei.

History

Construction of the school was completed on November 30, 1993. When the school was established on May 9, 1994, it was known as Sekolah Menengah Kampung Pandan (English: Kampong Pandan Secondary School) and catered for only secondary students. The school was renamed to its current name on August 3, 1996.

In 1997, a sixth form centre was created within the school. This has allowed students to pursue their pre-university studies in Kuala Belait, whereas all previous sixth form education in Brunei had been offered only in Bandar Seri Begawan.

At present, the school offers curriculum leading up to BC-GCE "O", and "A" level examinations.

List of Principals
 Dayang Annie Anak Sindai

 Awang Othman bin Haji Adol

 Pengiran Hajjah Zeiniun binti Pengiran Mudin

 Mr. Awang Steven Shim Sheau Huei

Staff
The school has 120 teachers, as well as office staff and other workers.

School motto
Bertekad ke Arah Kecemerlangan (Strive towards excellence).

Secondary Level
•Year 7

•Year 8

•Year 9

•Year 10

•Year 11

Sixth Form subjects
The school offers 15 subjects for the GCE "A" Level course, namely:
Mathematics
Physics
Chemistry
Biology
Accounting
Economics
Business Studies
Sociology
History
Geography
Literature in English
Bahasa Melayu
Syariah
Usuluddin
Psychology

General Paper is a compulsory AS Level subject for all Sixth Form students, for which a credit 6 in BGCE "O" English Language is necessary. Sixth form students without a credit 6 in that subject usually sit again for it in June or November of their lower sixth year to enable them to undertake the GP course beginning in upper sixth.

References

External links 
 SMSA Pre-U Blogspot
 SMSA career
 SMSA counselling

See also 
 List of schools in Brunei

Secondary schools in Brunei
Sixth form colleges in Brunei
Educational institutions established in 1993
1993 establishments in Brunei